Dub Narcotic Sound System (D.N.S.S.) is an Olympia, Washington based indie-funk musical group founded by Calvin Johnson, signed to K Records.

Origins
The band was named after Calvin Johnson's basement recording studio, Dub Narcotic.
The band and its members were all based out of Olympia, Washington when they were active in the band.  Dub Narcotic Sound System has toured in the United States, Japan, Canada and Europe with bands such as Built to Spill, Fugazi, and the Jon Spencer Blues Explosion.

Discography
The following studio recordings by D.N.S.S. were released on K Records:
 Industrial Breakdown (EP; 1995)
 Ridin' Shotgun (EP; 1995)
 Boot Party  (1996)
 Bone Dry (EP; 1997)
 Out Of Your Mind (1998)
 Sideways Soul: Dub Narcotic Sound System meets the Jon Spencer Blues Explosion in a Dancehall Style (1999)
 Handclappin' (EP; 2003)
 Degenerate Introduction (2004)

References

External links

American funk musical groups
Indie rock musical groups from Washington (state)
K Records artists
Musical groups established in 1995
Musical groups from Olympia, Washington
Sound systems